Larissa Sansour (Arabic: لاريسا سنسور; born 1973) is a Palestinian artist who currently resides in London, England. She is into photography, film, sculpture, and installation art. Some of her works include Tank (2003), Bethlehem Bandolero (2005), Happy Days (2006), Cairo Taxilogue (2008), The Novel of Novel and Novel (2009), Falafel Road (2010), Palestinauts (2010), Nation State (2012),  In the Future, They Ate From the Finest Porcelain (2016), and Archaeology in Absentia (2016).

Career 
She was born in East Jerusalem and studied at the Byam Shaw School of Art. Sansour received a BFA from the Maryland Institute College of Art and an MA in fine art from New York University. She studied art history and criticism at the University of Baltimore and was a visiting student at the Royal Danish Academy of Fine Arts.

In her art, Sansour uses video, photography, book form and web pages, as well as installation art. She includes references to various elements from popular culture such as Spaghetti Westerns, horror films and superheroes. She also makes use of science fiction as a vehicle for providing an alternative perspective on current social issues.

Sansour has had solo exhibitions in New York City, Copenhagen, Stockholm, Istanbul and Paris. She has been included in group exhibitions including the Istanbul Biennial, the Busan Biennale in South Korea and the Liverpool Biennial, as well as exhibitions at the Tate Modern, the Brooklyn Museum, the Centre Georges Pompidou, the Museo Nacional Centro de Arte Reina Sofía, the Louisiana Museum of Modern Art and the Hiroshima City Museum of Contemporary Art. Her work is included in the collections of the Imperial War Museum in London, the Wolverhampton Art Gallery, the Museum of Contemporary Art in Denmark, the Carlsberg Foundation, the Barjeel Art Foundation, the Louis Vuitton Collection and the Nadour Collection.

Her show at the Mosaic Rooms was cited in Art Review as one of the world's "must-see" exhibitions in the summer of 2016.

In 2011, the annual Elysée art prize competition was cancelled after Sansour's work Nation Estate was excluded by sponsor Lacoste on the grounds that the work was not compatible with the competitions theme of "joie de vivre". Interpreting Lacoste's decision as political, the Musée de l'Élysée chose to cancel the prize.

Larissa Sansour represented Denmark at the Venice Biennale 2019 with her exhibition Heirloom; an enactment of a dystopic future in a state of an undergone ecological collapse. In 2020 her work was presented at Bildmuseet, Umeå University, Sweden, showing the Heirloom exhibition. The exhibition included Sansour's science fiction film In Vitro, which, as the artist explained in Ocula Magazine, 'questions the cyclicality of history and the fact that no matter where we are heading, revision is always needed'.

Venice Biennale 2019
In 2018 Larissa Sansour was appointed by The Danish Arts Foundation to represent Denmark at Venice Biennale 2019 – La Biennale di Venezia – the 58th International Art Exhibition. Dutch curator Nat Muller has been selected to curate the exhibition, called Heirloom, in the Danish pavilion.

Personal life
Larissa lives and works in London having previously been resident in Denmark. Her sister is filmmaker Leila Sansour.

Filmography 
 Bethlehem Bandolero, short (2005)
 Happy Days, 2, short (2006)
 Soup Over Bethlehem, documentary (2007)
 Run Lara Run, 2, short (2008)
 SBARA, short (2008)
 A Space Exodus, science fiction (2009), nominated for a Muhr award at the Dubai International Film Festival
 Falafel Road, documentary (2011), with Oreet Ashery
 Trespass the Salt, documentary (2011)
 Feast of the Inhabitants, short (2012)
 Nation Estate, science fiction (2012)
 In The Future, They Ate from the Finest Porcelain, science fiction (2015), nominated for a Muhr award at the Dubai International Film Festival
 In Vitro, short (2019)

References

External links 
 
 

1973 births
Living people
Palestinian women artists
Palestinian women film directors
Palestinian film directors